Menesia discimaculata is a species of beetle in the family Cerambycidae. It was described by Per Olof Christopher Aurivillius in 1923, originally under the genus Daphisia.

References

Menesia
Beetles described in 1923